Mob Story  is a 1989 Canadian comedy film starring John Vernon, Kate Vernon, Al Waxman and Margot Kidder.

Plot 

The story is about a New York gangster who is forced to go on the run and hides out in the small town where he grew up.

Cast
 John Vernon as Don "Luce" Luciano  
 Kate Vernon as Mindy  
 Al Waxman as Sam 
 Margot Kidder as Dolores
 Diana Barrington as Maria
 Robert Morelli as Gianni

Production 
It was filmed in Winnipeg, Manitoba, Canada.

Crew
Peter Lhotka Assistant Production Manager

External links
 
 

1989 films
1989 comedy films
Canadian crime comedy films
English-language Canadian films
Films scored by Paul Zaza
Films shot in Winnipeg
1980s Canadian films
Canadian gangster films